Daniel Sheffey (1770December 3, 1830) was a U.S. Representative from Virginia.

Biography
He was born in Frederick in the Province of Maryland to Johann Adam Schieffe, a cobbler, and his wife Magdelena Loehr of Südwestpfalz, Germany. They had immigrated to the Province of Maryland about 1764. Largely self-educated, Sheffey pursued classical studies. Apprenticed as a shoemaker in his father's shop, he spent his leisure hours observing nature and the mysteries of astronomy; upon attaining his majority, he walked to Winchester, Virginia and began plying his trade until he built up his resources. He moved to Wytheville, Virginia, in 1791.

He worked at his trade, all the while he attained a reputation for quick wit and immense intellect. Finally, he was received as a student into the office of Alexander Smyth, Esq. an eminent lawyer in that part of the state, and afterwards commander of the northern army during the War of 1812 .
He was admitted to the bar July 1, 1802, and commenced the practice of his profession in Wytheville.
He moved to Staunton, Virginia where he continued the practice of law.
He served as member of the Virginia State House of Delegates 1800-1804.
He served in the Virginia State senate, 1804-1808.

Sheffey was elected as a Federalist to the Eleventh and to the three succeeding Congresses (March 4, 1809 – March 3, 1817).  
On January 30, 1812,  he married Maria Hanson, the daughter of Lt. Col. Samuel Hanson of Mulberry Grove, Maryland and great-niece to John Hanson, President of the Continental Congress. In 1814, Sheffey was elected a member of the American Antiquarian Society.  He was again a member of the Virginia State House of Delegates in 1822 and 1823.

He died at the Warm Springs, Virginia on December 3, 1830 while on his way from Greenbrier Chancery Court to his home in Staunton, Virginia. He was buried in the churchyard at Trinity Episcopal Church (Staunton, Virginia).

Electoral history

1809; Sheffey was elected to the U.S. House of Representatives with 66.56% of the vote, defeating Democrat Republican Francis Preston.
1811; Sheffey was re-elected unopposed.
1813; Sheffey was re-elected unopposed.
1815; Sheffey was re-elected unopposed.

References

Sources

Southern Literary Messenger, Vol. 4, p. 346, Thom. W. White, Publisher & Proprietor, Richmond, Virginia, June 1838
Daniel Sheffey at Find a Grave

1770 births
1830 deaths
Virginia lawyers
Politicians from Frederick, Maryland
Federalist Party members of the United States House of Representatives from Virginia
Members of the American Antiquarian Society
People from Staunton, Virginia
19th-century American lawyers